Putney Vale Cemetery and Crematorium in southwest London is located in Putney Vale, surrounded by Putney Heath and Wimbledon Common and Richmond Park. It is located within  of parkland. The cemetery was opened in 1891 and the crematorium in 1938. The cemetery was originally laid out on land which had belonged to Newlands Farm, which was established in the medieval period.

The cemetery has two chapels, one being a traditional Church of England chapel and the other being used for multi-denomination or non-religious services. It has a large Garden of Remembrance.

There are 87 Commonwealth war grave burials from the First World War and 97 from the Second World War in the cemetery. Six Victoria Cross recipients have been buried or cremated here. The burials are scattered throughout the grounds of the cemetery and a Screen Wall Memorial has been erected to record the names of those whose graves are not marked by headstones. Those who have been cremated at Putney Vale Crematorium also have their names recorded on these panels.

Notable burials and cremations

Funerals held at Putney Vale include those of:
 Ellinor Lily Davenport Adams, journalist and children's author
 Major General Ernest Alexander, World War I Victoria Cross recipient
 Julie Alexander, actress and model (cremated)
 Dev Anand, Indian film actor (cremated, ashes scattered in Godavari River, India)
 Peter Arne, actor
 Arthur Askey, comedian and actor (cremated)
 Sir Stanley Baker, Welsh actor and film producer (cremated, ashes scattered near Ferndale, Glamorgan)
 Sir Henry George Outram Bax-Ironside, British diplomat, ambassador to Venezuela, Chile, Switzerland and Bulgaria
 Robert Beatty, actor (cremated)
 Evelyn Beauchamp (née Herbert), one of the first people to enter the tomb of the Tutankhamun
 James Beck, actor noted for his role as Private Joe Walker, the Cockney spiv in the BBC sitcom Dad's Army (cremated)
 Admiral The 1st Baron Beresford, following state funeral at St Paul's Cathedral.
 John Bindon, actor
 Major-General Charles Guinand Blackader, WWI general
 Lillian Board MBE, silver medal-winning Olympian (cremated)
 William Boulter, World War I Victoria Cross recipient (cremated)
 Harry Cunningham Brodie, MP for Reigate (1906–1910) and major in Middlesex Yeomanry
 Kate Carney, famed music hall singer and comedian
 Howard Carter, archaeologist and Egyptologist, noted as a primary discoverer of the tomb of Tutankhamun.
Lt-Col. Sir Henry Dickonson Nightingale, 13th Baronet, Royal Marine Officer during Second Anglo-Burmese War in 1851-52
 Admiral Herbert Charles Campbell da Costa, Royal Navy flag officer in First World War
 Sandy Denny, singer, songwriter and member of Fairport Convention
 Henry Fielding Dickens, barrister and the eighth of 10 children born to author Charles Dickens and his wife Catherine.
 Clive Dunfee, racing driver.
 Sir Jacob Epstein, sculptor.
 Sid Field English comedy entertainer
 Golchin Gilani, 20th century Iranian poet.
 Lieutenant Colonel Harry Greenwood, World War I Victoria Cross recipient
 Kenelm Lee Guinness, local resident and member of Guinness brewing family, early motor racer and entrepreneur behind the famous Putney Vale-made KLG spark plugs
 George Dickinson Hadley, gastroenterologist (cremated)
 Lieutenant Colonel Reginald Hayward, World War I Victoria Cross recipient (cremated)
 Eugen Hersch, artist and portrait painter whose subjects included President Paul von Hindenburg and Joseph Joachim.
 Sir Edward Hulton, 1st Baronet, newspaper proprietor 
 James Hunt, Formula One Grand Prix world champion (cremated)
 John Ingram, 32, a grave digger at Putney Vale who died in a freak accident, hit in the chest from a stray bullet from the rifle range at Wimbledon Common. Buried yards from where he fell, leaving a pregnant wife and infant daughter. Each year on 22 May, local resident John Cooper lays flowers on the man's grave.
 Samuel Insull, Anglo-American utilities magnate
 J. Bruce Ismay, chairman of White Star Line and a passenger of its ship RMS Titanic, and wife Julia Florence Ismay
 Hattie Jacques, comedy actress who appeared in many Carry On films (cremated).
 Alexander Kerensky, exiled former Russian prime minister and leading figure in the Russian revolution of 1917, until Vladimir Lenin took over
 Sir John Lambert CMG KCVO, soldier and diplomat
 Hazel, Lady Lavery, painter
 Sir John Lavery, painter
 David Lean CBE, critically acclaimed film director
 Rosa Lewis, hotelier of the Cavendish, Jermyn Street, known as the "Queen of Cooks" and "Duchess of Duke Street"
 Sir John William Lorden, resident of Ravenswood, Putney Hill and former president of the National Federation of Property Owners and Ratepayers
 Daniel Massey, Canadian-British actor and Golden Globe award recipient
 Hilary Minster, British actor
 Kenneth More, character actor post-Second World War (cremated)
 The 1st Viscount Morley of Blackburn, OM, politician, ashes buried here after cremation at Golders Green
 Kenneth Nelson, actor (The Boys in the Band)
 Joe O'Gorman, music hall performer and founder of the Variety Artistes' Federation
 Jennifer Paterson, TV chef of Two Fat Ladies fame (cremated)
 Lance Percival, actor and singer (cremated)
 Jon Pertwee, noted Doctor Who actor (cremated).
 Roy Plomley OBE, creator of the world's longest running radio programme, BBC Radio 4's Desert Island Discs
 Nyree Dawn Porter OBE, actress (cremated)
 Sir Edward J. Reed, 19th-century constructor of the Royal Navy, MP, author and railway magnate
 George Reid, former prime minister of Australia
 Alfred Joseph Richards, First World War recipient of the Victoria Cross
 Sir Ronald Ross, discoverer of malaria transmission by mosquitoes
 William Scoresby Routledge, British ethnographer, anthropologist and adventurer
 Charles Rumney Samson, pioneer naval aviator.
 Eugen Sandow, the Prussian known as the father of modern bodybuilding
 Lieutenant Colonel Harry Norton Schofield, Boer War Victoria Cross recipient
 Richard Seaman, noted pre-Second World War Grand Prix driver for Mercedes-Benz, who still maintain his grave
 Vladek Sheybal, a Polish character actor
 Joan Sims, comedy actress including the Carry On films (cremated)
 Edwin Tate, son of Henry Tate of Tate & Lyle sugar refining fame, in a family mausoleum inscribed with the family motto "Thincke and Thancke"
 C. W. Stephens (c.1846–1917), British architect, best known for Harrods 
 Vesta Tilley, born Matilda Alice Powles, a male impersonator, who was a star in both Britain and the US for over 30 years.

 Alain de Cadenet,Formula One driver, 2 time Australian Super Prix winner, Entered the 24 Hours of Le Mans a record 15 times

 Micky Johnson,Australian,pre-war racing driver, 1929 Alps Grand Prix Winner (cremated)

References

External links
Photo Gallery of Putney Vale Cemetery
Find A Grave at Putney Vale Cemetery
Profile of Putney Vale Cemetery
Putney Vale Cemetery on the Commonwealth War Graves Commission website
Putney Vale Crematorium at Remembrance Online

Cemeteries in London
Parks and open spaces in the London Borough of Wandsworth
Anglican cemeteries in the United Kingdom
Crematoria in London
1891 establishments in England